PP-6 Murree is a Constituency of Provincial Assembly of Punjab.

Area
Murree Tehsil
Kotli Sattian Tehsil

1985—1988:PP-1 (Rawalpindi-I) 
1985 Pakistani general election was held on 25 February 1985 in Pakistan. This election was nonpartisan basis election, around 1300 candidates contested the elections. Chaudhary Nawaz ul Haq Chuhan was elected from PP-1 (Rawalpindi-I) by defeating Doctor Muhammad Afzal Ejaz.

2002—2008:PP-1 (Rawalpindi-I)

2008—2013: PP-1 (Rawalpindi-I)
General elections were held on 11 May 2013. Raja Ashfaq Sarwar won this seat with 50982 votes.

All candidates receiving over 1,000 votes are listed here.

2018—2023: PP-6 (Rawalpindi-I)

General elections are scheduled to be held on 25 July 2018. In 2018 Pakistani general election, Muhammad Latasab Satti a ticket holder of PTI won PP-6 Rawalpindi I election by taking 64,642 votes.

See also
 PP-5 Attock-V
 PP-7 Rawalpindi-I

References

External links
 Election commission Pakistan's official website
 Awazoday.com check result
 Official Website of Government of Punjab

R